Ham Radio may refer to:

Amateur radio
"Ham Radio" (Frasier), an episode of Frasier
Ham Radio (magazine), an amateur radio magazine
"Ham Radio" Friedrichshafen (fair), an international amateur radio fair